The Corvo is a bladed weapon typically used in Chile. It is a double-edged knife with a curved blade of approximately 12 inches. Initially a tool similar to a grape hook, it was widely used in combat during the War of the Pacific. It was not standard issue, but rather a personal weapon or tool that the soldiers brought with them from home.

Per local legend, but now widely debunked by historians, Chilean soldiers would consume chupilca del diablo in order to drive themselves into a frenzy prior to close-combat, attacking the enemy with their corvos.

When fighting with a corvo, the wielder will not feint with the blade itself; traditionally it is used in conjunction with a rag, poncho or stick in the off-hand, which allows the bearer to parry an incoming attack.  The corvo is then used to counterattack with a swiping, slashing or stabbing motion.

Due to its popularity, the Chilean Army refined the weapon and added it to their arsenal. Today it is the traditional symbol of Chilean commandos and its use is encouraged in training.

Variants
There are a few different models of corvo, the modern versions are:
Corvo Comando, or Pico de Condor (Condor's Beak), with a nearly 90 degree bend that spans a third of the blade.
Corvo atacameño or Garra de Puma (Cougar Claw), which has a very slight curve to the blade (equal to approximately 45°) but is normally longer than the Commando variant.

See also
Fairbairn–Sykes fighting knife
Cuchillo De Paracaidista
Tantō

References

FAMAE
Military knives
Weapons of Chile